Gymnoglossa is a small genus of tachinid flies found in Russia and South Africa.

Species include:
 Gymnoglossa munroi Curran, 1934 – Russia
 Gymnoglossa transsylvanica Mik, 1898 – South Africa

References

Tachinidae
Tachinidae genera